Julia A. Berwind (1864- May 18, 1961) was a Newport, Rhode Island socialite, and a social welfare activist.

Biography
She was born in Philadelphia, the sister of coal magnates Edward Julius Berwind and Charles Frederick Berwind. She was the owner of The Elms in Newport, Rhode Island after the death of her brother Edward. 

She was noted for driving herself about town, which was unusual for women in general and for women of her class in particular.  She was also known to invite local children to the estate for cookies and milk. 

Although members of "high society" generally cut back on their extravagant lifestyles due to the depression and World War II, Julia Berwind maintained a full staff of 40 servants at the Elms estate in Newport.

She died in Newport, Rhode Island in 1961.

After her death, the Elms was purchased by the Preservation Society of Newport County so it could be preserved and be open to the public.

References

1870 births
1961 deaths
American socialites
People from Newport, Rhode Island
American social activists
Activists from Rhode Island